The 1948 Alabama Crimson Tide football team (variously "Alabama", "UA" or "Bama") represented the University of Alabama in the 1948 college football season. It was the Crimson Tide's 54th overall and 15th season as a member of the Southeastern Conference (SEC). The team was led by head coach Harold Drew, in his second year, and played their home games at Denny Stadium in Tuscaloosa, Legion Field in Birmingham and Ladd Stadium in Mobile, Alabama. They finished with a record of six wins, four losses and one tie (6–4–1 overall, 4–4–1 in the SEC).

Alabama opened the season with a loss to Tulane, the first for Alabama to open a season since 1903. The next week the Crimson Tide had to score a touchdown with ten seconds left to salvage a tie with Vanderbilt in the first game ever played at Ladd Stadium. Alabama then defeated Duquesne at home, lost at Tennessee and won at Mississippi State before their 35–0 loss to eventual SEC Champion Georgia. Alabama then closed their season with a homecoming victory over Florida and a 55–0 win over Auburn in the renewal of their rivalry.

Schedule

Game summaries

Tulane

Source:

To open the 1948 season, Alabama traveled to New Orleans and were upset by the Tulane Green Wave 21–14. After a scoreless first quarter, Tulane took a 7–0 halftime lead when Bobby Jones capped a 78-yard drive with his seven-yard touchdown run. The Green Wave extended their lead further to 21–0 in the third quarter after touchdowns were scored by Eddie Price on a four-yard run and on a 20-yard Joe Ernst pass to Dick Sheffield. Down by three touchdowns, the Crimson Tide began a comeback only to fall just short. Alabama points were scored on a four-yard Tom Calvin run in the third and on a nine-yard Charley Davis run in the fourth. The loss was the first for the Crimson Tide to open the season since the 1903 team kicked off with a 30–0 loss to Vanderbilt, and brought Alabama's all-time record against Tulane to 15–6–1.

Vanderbilt

Source:

Alabama played the Vanderbilt Commodores to a 14–14 tie game in what was the inaugural game played at Ladd Stadium in Mobile. After a scoreless first quarter for the second consecutive week, Vanderbilt took a 7–0 halftime lead after Herb Rich scored on a four-yard run. Alabama later tied the game at 7–7 in the fourth quarter after Ed Salem scored on a ten-yard run. The Commodores responded on the next possession with a three-yard Dean Davidson touchdown run for a 14–7 lead. Then Crimson Tide then tied the game at 14–14 as time expired in the fourth when Salem hit Jack Brown in the endzone. The tie brought Alabama's all-time record against Vanderbilt to 16–11–1.

Duquesne

Sources:

In their first Tuscaloosa game of the season, Alabama defeated the Duquesne Dukes 48–6 before 20,000 fans at Denny Stadium. Billy Cadenhead opened the scoring in the first quarter to cap a 94-yard drive with his four-yard touchdown run for a 7–0 Alabama lead. A trio of second quarter touchdowns extended the Crimson Tide lead to 27–0 at halftime. Points were scored on 42-yard Charles Davis reverse, a 72-yard Pete Pettus punt return and on a 17-yard Jim Burkett run.

The Crimson Tide continued their scoring with a 67-yard Cadenhead touchdown in the third run before the Dukes scored their only points of the game. Len Kubiak scored for Duquesne with his one-yard touchdown run to cap a ten-play, 62-yard drive. Alabama then closed the game with a pair of fourth-quarter touchdowns for the 48–6 victory. Points were scored on a 43-yard Travis Hoicks pass to Don Spurrell and later on a six-yard Paul Taylor run. The victory improved Alabama's all-time record against Duquesne to 2–0.

Tennessee

Sources:

Against Tennessee, the Crimson Tide were defeated by the Volunteers 21–6 before a soldout crowd at Shields-Watkins Field. Tennessee opened the game with a 21-yard, W. C. Cooper touchdown pass to Bob Lund for a 7–0 Volunteer lead. In the third, Alabama scored their only points on a one-yard Charley Davis touchdown run, but a missed extra point allowed Tennessee to retain the lead 7–6. The Volunteers then scored a pair of fourth-quarter touchdowns to win 21–6. The loss brought Alabama's all-time record against Tennessee to 17–10–3.

Mississippi State

Source:

A week after their loss at Tennessee, Alabama responded the next week with a 10–7 victory against the Mississippi State Maroons on homecoming at Scott Field. The Crimson Tide scored all ten of their points in the first half. Billy Cadenhead scored in the first on a two-yard touchdown run and Ed Salem converted a 14-yard field goal in the second for a 10–0 halftime lead. The Maroons responded late with their only points scored on a 42-yard Tom McWilliams touchdown pass to Kenneth Davis to make the final score 10–7. The victory improved Alabama's all-time record against Mississippi State to 24–7–2.

Georgia

Sources:

Before what was the largest crowd to date to attend a game in the state of Alabama, the Crimson Tide suffered their worst defeat since the 1910 season with their 35–0 loss against the Georgia Bulldogs. The Bulldogs' first half touchdowns were scored in the first quarter on a 19-yard John Rauch pass to Bobby Walston and a 38-yard pass from Rauch to Joseph Geri. The Bulldogs' second half touchdowns were scored in the third quarter on a three-yard Bernie Reid run and on an 80-yard interception return by Joseph Jackura and in the fourth quarter on an 11-yard Billy Mixon run. The loss was the worst for the Crimson Tide since they were defeated 36–0 by Georgia Tech and it brought Alabama's all-time record against Georgia to 16–15–3.

Mississippi Southern

Source:

A week after their worst defeat in 38 years, Alabama rebounded and defeated the Mississippi Southern Golden Eagles at Denny Stadium 27–0. The Crimson Tide scored touchdowns in four quarters in the victory. First half points were scored on a one-yard Butch Avinger run in the first quarter and on a 32-yard Ed Salem pass to Clem Welsh in the second quarter for a 14–0 halftime lead. Second half points were scored on a 20-yard Jim Franko interception return in the third quarter and on a 5-yard Salem pass to Welsh in the fourth quarter for the 27–0 win. The victory improved Alabama's all-time record against Mississippi Southern to 2–0.

Georgia Tech

Source:

Against the Yellow Jackets, the Crimson Tide entered the game as a two touchdown underdog, but left Atlanta with a 14–12 upset over Georgia Tech. The victory improved Alabama's all-time record against Georgia Tech to 15–12–3.

LSU

Source:

A week after their upset win over Georgia Tech, Alabama was defeated by LSU 26–6 at Tiger Stadium. The loss brought Alabama's all-time record against LSU to 13–5–3.

Florida

Source:

On homecoming at Denny Stadium, Alabama defeated the Florida Gators 34–28. The victory improved Alabama's all-time record against Florida to 6–3.

Auburn

Source:

This meeting against Auburn marked the resumption of their rivalry with the Tigers after a 41-year hiatus. The two schools had met regularly from 1892 through 1895 and then regularly from 1900 through 1907. However, trivial disputes led to the series being discontinued in 1908. Their disputes centered on disagreements on how much per diem to allow players for the trip to Birmingham, how many players each school should bring and where to find officials. By the time all these matters were resolved, it was too late to play in 1908, and the series ended. By 1947 pressure to renew the Iron Bowl had grown to the point that the state legislature threatened to withhold funding from the two schools unless they scheduled a game, and in 1948 Alabama and Auburn finally agreed to meet on a football field.

Prior to the game, Alabama had not played Auburn since their 6–6 tie in 1907. In the renewal of the dormant series, Alabama defeated Auburn 55–0 at Legion Field, in what remains the most lopsided win by either team in the history of the series. The Crimson Tide took a 7–0 lead in the first quarter after Gordon Pettus threw an eight-yard touchdown pass to Butch Avinger. Alabama then extended their lead to 21–0 at halftime with a pair of second-quarter touchdowns. Points were scored on a 20-yard Ed Salem pass to Clem Welsh and then on a six-yard Welsh reverse. The Crimson Tide then scored six second half touchdowns and continued to hold the Tigers scoreless in the 55–0 rout.

Third-quarter touchdowns were scored by Salem on a 17-yard run and on a 53-yard Salem pass to Rebel Steiner. Alabama then closed the game out with three touchdowns in the fourth quarter. Points were scored on a 20-yard Salem pass to Howard Pierson, a punt blocked by Larry Lauer and recovered in the endzone by Tom Salem and on a 20-yard Don Spurrell interception return. The victory improved Alabama's all-time record against Auburn to 5–7–1.

Personnel

Varsity letter winners

Coaching staff

References

Alabama
Alabama Crimson Tide football seasons
Alabama Crimson Tide football